Cycling demonstration towns were part of a UK policy initiative to promote cycling that ran from 2005-2011.

2005: launch
In 2005, 6 towns in England were chosen to be cycling demonstration towns to promote the use of cycling as a means of transport.

The decision was made by Cycling England, a body set up by the Department for Transport. Each year for three years the towns received £500,000 to spend on cycling (apart from Aylesbury which received £300,000).

In 2005 the cycling demonstration town status was awarded to:
Aylesbury
Brighton and Hove
Darlington
Derby
Exeter
Lancaster with Morecambe

2009: extension
In 2009 the following towns and cities were also awarded additional funding. At this time, the term 'Cycle Demonstration Town' was changed to 'Cycling Town', reflecting that the initiative had moved from a pilot stage into full operation.

 Blackpool
 Bristol (cycling city)
 Cambridge
 Chester
 Colchester
 Leighton Buzzard with Linslade
 Shrewsbury
 Southend
 Southport
 Stoke-on-Trent
 Woking
 York

2011: cancellation
The programme ended in 2011 when Cycling England was disbanded.

See also 
 Outline of cycling

References

External links
Cycling-Cities-Towns Homepage

Cycling in England
+
2005 establishments in England
Types of towns